Tukulua Lokotui (born 31 December 1979) is a rugby union footballer who played at lock for Béziers. Lokotui played for Tonga at the 2011 and the 2015 Rugby World Cup squads.

In 2013 Lokotui was cited for a dangerous tackle on Dave Attwood when Bath defeated Gloucester. He was also named in Tonga's squad for their end of the year tour of Asia and Europe.

References

External links

2011 Rugby World Cup Profile

1979 births
Living people
Tongan rugby union players
Tonga international rugby union players
Tongan expatriate rugby union players
Expatriate rugby union players in England
Expatriate rugby union players in France
Expatriate rugby union players in Japan
Tongan expatriate sportspeople in England
Tongan expatriate sportspeople in France
Tongan expatriate sportspeople in Japan
Hawke's Bay rugby union players
Wellington rugby union players
Gloucester Rugby players
Hanazono Kintetsu Liners players
Stade Français players
Rugby union locks
Rugby union players from Auckland